When You're With Me is a 1970 West German film romance directed by Franz Josef Gottlieb and starring Roy Black, Lex Barker, and Zienia Merton.

Filming took place in international settings including several airports. Location filming was done in Germany as well as Bangkok and Colombo.

Cast

References

Bibliography

External links 
 

1970 films
1970s romance films
German romance films
West German films
1970s German-language films
Films directed by Franz Josef Gottlieb
Gloria Film films
German aviation films
Films set in Thailand
1970s German films